The Connecticut Hurricanes, also known by their nickname the Hurcs, is a 501 (c) (3) non-profit organization based in Seymour, Connecticut existing as an all-age, co-ed, competitive drum and bugle corps. The Hurricanes reign as the oldest, continually active organization in DCA, with some of the most extensive history of any senior corps.

Mission statement
"The mission of the Hurricanes Drum and Bugle Corps is to provide a competitive platform on which members can build successful healthy lifestyles through music and performance, as well as to promote artistic excellence. Emphasis is placed on development of self-esteem, self-motivation and self-reliance. It encourages team work, sportsmanship, civic pride and contributions of one's personal best to a group effort geared toward individual achievement of common goals. It is an education designed to help members become the best they can be."

History

The extensive history of the Hurricanes can be divided into three distinct periods as follows;

Pre-competitive years, 1932-1954
The Hurricanes were formed in 1932 in Derby, CT and were originally known as the John H. Collins Post Fife Drum & Bugle Corps. Members were predominantly veterans from World War I. They thrived as a parade corps for twenty three years accompanying the John H. Collins American Legion Post in local parades as well as to the American Legion’s State and National Conventions throughout the U.S.A. In the post World War II years of the 1940s the ranks were swelled by returning vets, as well as many new members, and the interest began shifting towards competitive field competition, an activity rapidly gaining in popularity. The fifes were phased out beginning in 1949 as the corps transformed to drums and bugles only.

Pre-DCA, 1955-1963
The Corps officially transformed into a competitive field corps in 1955 and became a member of the Yankee Circuit, and subsequently the Northeastern Circuit. Though the corps was unofficially known by the nickname Hurricanes since 1951, Hurricane Diane and Hurricane Connie, powerful back to back storms that devastated the Naugatuck Valley of Connecticut in 1955, served as the inspiration to permanently change the name of the corps to the Connecticut Hurricanes in February 1956. The fledgling corps endured the expected growing pains that accompanied the transition in those first few years, but a top notch instructional staff and gritty determination propelled the Corps towards new heights and they would eventually become one of the premier corps of the Northeastern Circuit, where they competed through 1963, garnering two championships.

Modern years (DCA), 1964-present
In 1964 on the heels of a successful rise to prominence in the Northeastern Circuit, the Hurricanes became a charter member of Drum Corps Associates (DCA). Since that  inaugural year of DCA competition, they have captured four DCA Championship titles (1967, 1969, 1981, and 2022) and have failed to reach the finals in the DCA championship contest but three times (1986, 1989 and 2003). The Hurricanes have finished in the coveted top five in DCA finals competition a respectable twenty-five times.

Show summary (1957-2022)

Identity

There are several distinguishing characteristics the give the Hurricanes their unique identity: 
 The official colors are green, black and white. 
 A lightning bolt is prominently featured on the uniform.
 The Drum Majors and the Honor Guard wear military style peaked hats in honor of Corps tradition.
 The Corps theme song is the main theme from The Magnificent Seven.
 The official street beat is "Downfall of Paris" as well as the marching beat known as "The Horse Walk."
 The Corps song is sung to the melody of "They Call the Wind Maria".

Championships
Major titles garnered by the Hurricanes;
 Yankee Circuit Champions, 1958
 Northeastern Circuit Champions, 1962 and 1963
 World Open Senior Champions, 1964
 American Legion National Champions, 1967
 National Dream Champions, 1967, 1968, and 1969
 Drum Corps Associates Champions, 1967, 1969, 1981 and 2022

Notable alumni
 The Hurricanes Hall of Fame was established in 1994 to recognize those individuals who have demonstrated a high level of commitment, dedication and contribution to the Corps as well as the marching arts community. As of 2022 the Hall of Fame has enshrined seventy six Hurricanes for their outstanding service.
 There are seventy two Hurricanes of Distinction who are acclaimed in the realm of drum corps as well as the marching arts community on the whole and have been recognized as such through induction into the World Drum Corps Hall of Fame and/or the Drum Corps International Hall of Fame.

References

External links
 Official website 
 Official website
 Drum Corps Associates

Non-profit organizations based in Connecticut
Musical groups from Connecticut
1932 establishments in Connecticut
Musical groups established in 1932